Eucalyptus pellita, commonly known as the large-fruited red mahogany, is a species of medium to tall tree that is endemic to north-eastern Queensland. It has rough, fibrous or flaky bark on the trunk and branches, lance-shaped to egg-shaped adult leaves, flower buds in groups of seven, white flowers and cup-shaped to conical fruit.

Description
It has rough, greyish or reddish, fibrous or flaky bark on the trunk and branches. Flowering has been recorded in February and October and the flowers are white.

Taxonomy
Eucalyptus pellita was first formally described in 1864 by Victorian government botanist Ferdinand von Mueller in Fragmenta phytographiae Australiae, based on plant material collected near Rockingham Bay by John Dallachy. The specific epithet (pellita) is from Latin, meaning "covered with skin", possibly referring to the leaves.

Distribution and habitat
Large-fruited red mahogany grows in open forest, mainly on gentle slopes. It is found in wet, near-coastal forests north from Abergowrie to Papua New Guinea.

Conservation status
This eucalypt is listed as "least concern" under the Queensland Government Nature Conservation Act 1992.

See also
List of Eucalyptus species

References

Flora of Queensland
Flora of Papua New Guinea
Trees of Australia
pellita
Myrtales of Australia
Taxa named by Ferdinand von Mueller
Plants described in 1864